Pari Kola may refer to:
 Pari Kola, Bandpey-ye Gharbi
 Pari Kola, Lalehabad